Coșcalia is a village and former commune in Căușeni District, Moldova. Until 12 April 2011, along with villages Florica and Plop, it formed commune of Coșcalia.

References

Communes of Căușeni District